Chust is a city in eastern Uzbekistan. It is the administrative center of Chust District. The City of Chust is located in the northern corner of the Fergana Valley along the river Chustsoy.

Chust is one of the oldest cities in the Fergana Valley. The Fergana automobile road passes through the city. This road connects Chust with several other places, such as the cities of Namangan, Andijan, Kokand and Fergana.

Chust underwent significant changes during the Soviet period. Many factories and institutions were built during that time. Currently, the city is an important center for cotton processing.

History 
Chust is one of the oldest cities in the Fergana Valley. Archaeological studies conducted in 1953, 1957, 1959, and 1961 found items dating back to the late Bronze/early Iron age in the area corresponding to present-day Chust. First scientific information about Chust can be found in A. F. Middendor's Ocherki o Ferganskoy doline (Essays About the Fergana Valley) which was published in St. Petersburg in 1882. According to local linguists, the word "chust" is a Persian word meaning "fast."

In the Middle Ages, Chust became a fortress. Babur's father Umar Shaikh Mirza II made Chust his residence in 1480. In the 16th century, the city consisted of several small fortresses. Later, a wall surrounding these fortresses was built. In 1882, the walls of the fortress were destroyed and the city started to expand. Over time, Chust became an industrial center. 

Following the Russian expansion into Central Asia, new factories were built in Chust. In 1912, there were six cotton mills and one leather factory in Chust. The town was made the administrative center of the newly created Chust District in 1926. Chust received a city status in 1969.

Chust received city status in 1937.

Geography 
Chust is located - above sea level. The city is situated in the northern corner of the Fergana Valley along the river Chustsoy.

Population 
The population consists of Uzbeks, Tajiks, Russians and a small number of Kyrgyzs and Uyghurs. Like the near-by, Kosonsoy, the city has a substantial Tajik minority. Russians, who were present in large numbers in the 20th century have largely left after the fall of the Soviet Union. A small Uyghur as well as Kyrgyz minority is also present.

Its population is 100200 (2021).

Climate 
Chust has a cold semi-arid climate (Köppen climate classification BSk) with cold winters and hot summers.

Economy
Chust is a center for cotton processing. It is also known for artisanal products, including pocket knives and embroidered cotton skullcaps known as tubeteika. The city contains the National Knife Factory, in which metal workers "smash and grind their knives from short lengths of steel or iron, honing each blade into the desired shape with a meticulous attention to detail". Knives with a curved tip are a trademark of Chust craftsmen.

Currently there are several

Education 
There are colleges and vocational schools in Chust. They include:
Chust College of Pedagogy
Chust College of Medicine
Chust College of Agriculture
Chust College of Economy
Chust College of Sport in Gova village
Chust Academic Lyceum

The city is also home to general education schools (which include boarding schools), two music and art schools, six vocational schools, and three children's sports schools.

Notable people 
The Russian oligarch Alisher Usmanov, who now lives in Russia, was born in Chust in 1953, and was imprisoned in Uzbekistan for six years for fraud. According to Forbes, he was in 2013 Russia's richest man with a fortune estimated at $17.6 billion and was the world's 34th richest person. But Usmanov's net worth fell by nearly a quarter from  February 22 to March 15, 2022, as the West imposed sanctions following the 2022 Russian invasion of Ukraine.

References

External links 
 A photo gallery of Chust

Cities in Uzbekistan
Populated places in Namangan Region